Budeni may refer to several villages in Romania:

 Budeni, a village in the town of Zlatna, Alba County
 Budeni, a village in Comana, Giurgiu
 Budeni, a village in the town of Dolhasca, Suceava County

See also 
 Buda (disambiguation)
 Budești (disambiguation)